The Goose River Bridge was a Pratt through truss bridge over the Goose River near Hillsboro, North Dakota that was built in 1893.  It was listed on the National Register of Historic Places in 1997.

It was delisted from the National Register on March 25, 2009.

See also
Northwood Bridge, (collapsed on June 22, 2019) also known as Goose River Bridge, a historic bridge from 1906, also NRHP-listed in North Dakota

References

Road bridges on the National Register of Historic Places in North Dakota
Bridges completed in 1893
Transportation in Traill County, North Dakota
National Register of Historic Places in Traill County, North Dakota
Wrought iron bridges in the United States
Former National Register of Historic Places in North Dakota
Bridges over the Goose River (North Dakota)